Franchere (sometimes Franchère) is an unincorporated community in central Alberta in the Municipal District of Bonnyville No. 87, located  east of Highway 28A,  west of Cold Lake.

The hamlet shares its name with nearby Franchere Bay, the northwest arm of nearby Moose Lake. Both are named for Gabriel Franchère, who visited the area in 1814 on his journey from Fort Astoria to Montreal.

Localities in the Municipal District of Bonnyville No. 87